Italian Tripolitania was an Italian colony, located in present-day western Libya, that existed from 1911 to 1934. It was part of the territory conquered from the Ottoman Empire after the Italo-Turkish War in 1911. Italian Tripolitania included the western northern half of Libya, with Tripoli as its main city. In 1934, it was unified with Italian Cyrenaica in the colony of Italian Libya.

History

Conquest and colonization

Italian Tripolitania and Italian Cyrenaica were formed in 1911, during the conquest of Ottoman Tripolitania in the Italo-Turkish War.

Despite a major revolt by the Arabs, the Ottoman sultan ceded Libya to the Italians by signing the 1912 Treaty of Lausanne. The Italians made extensive use of the Savari, colonial cavalry troops raised in December 1912. These units were recruited from the Arab-Berber population of Libya following the initial Italian occupation in 1911–12. The Savari, like the Spahi or mounted Libyan police, formed part of the Regio Corpo Truppe Coloniali della Libia (Royal Corps of Libyan Colonial Troops). 

Sheikh Sidi Idris al-Mahdi as-Senussi (later King Idris I), of the Senussi, led Libyan resistance in various forms through the outbreak of the Second World War. After the Italian army invaded Cyrenaica in 1913 as part of their invasion of Libya, the Senussi Order fought back against them. When the Order's leader, Ahmed Sharif as-Senussi, abdicated his position, he was replaced by Idris, who was his cousin. Pressured to do so by the Ottoman Empire, Ahmed had pursued armed attacks against British military forces stationed in neighbouring Egypt. On taking power, Idris put a stop to these attacks.

Instead he established a tacit alliance with the British, which would last for half a century and accord his Order de facto diplomatic status. Using the British as intermediaries, Idris led the Order into negotiations with the Italians in July 1916. These resulted in two agreements, at al-Zuwaytina in April 1916 and at Akrama in April 1917. The latter of these treaties left most of inland Cyrenaica under the control of the Senussi Order. Relations between the Senussi Order and the newly established Tripolitanian Republic were acrimonious. The Senussi attempted to militarily extend their power into eastern Tripolitania, resulting in a pitched battle at Bani Walid in which the Senussi were forced to withdraw back into Cyrenaica.

At the end of World War I, the Ottoman Empire signed an armistice agreement in which they ceded their claims over Libya to Italy. Italy however was facing serious economic, social, and political problems domestically, and was not prepared to re-launch its military activities in Libya. It issued statutes known as the Legge Fondamentale with both the Tripolitanian Republic in June 1919 and Cyrenaica in October 1919. These brought about a compromise by which all Libyans were accorded the right to a joint Libyan-Italian citizenship while each province was to have its own parliament and governing council. The Senussi were largely happy with this arrangement and Idris visited Rome as part of the celebrations to mark the promulgation of the settlement. 

In October 1920, further negotiations between Italy and Cyrenaica resulted in the Accord of al-Rajma, in which Idris was given the title of the Emir of Cyrenaica and permitted to autonomously administer the oases around Kufra, Jalu, Jaghbub, Awjila, and Ajdabiya. As part of the Accord he was given a monthly stipend by the Italian government, who agreed to take responsibility for policing and administration of areas under Senussi control. The Accord also stipulated that Idris must fulfill the requirements of the Legge Fondamentale by disbanding the Cyrenaican military units, however he did not comply with this. By the end of 1921, relations between the Senussi Order and the Italian government had again deteriorated.

Following the death of Tripolitanian leader Ramadan Asswehly in August 1920, the Republic descended into civil war. Many tribal leaders in the region recognised that this discord was weakening the region's chances of attaining full autonomy from Italy, and in November 1920 they met in Gharyan to bring an end to the violence. In January 1922 they agreed to request that Idris extend the Sanui Emirate of Cyrenaica into Tripolitania in order to bring stability; they presented a formal document with this request on 28 July 1922. Idris' advisers were divided on whether he should accept the offer or not. Doing so would contravene the al-Rajma Agreement and would damage relations with the Italian government, who opposed the political unification of Cyrenaica and Tripolitania as being against their interests. Nevertheless, in November 1922 Idris agreed to the proposal. Following the agreement, Idris feared that Italy — under its new Fascist leader Benito Mussolini—would militarily retaliate against the Senussi Order, and so he went into exile in Egypt in December 1922.

Fighting intensified after the accession to power in Italy of the dictator Benito Mussolini. Due to the effective resistance of the Libyan people against Italy's so-called "pacification campaign", Italian colonization of the Ottoman provinces of Tripolitania and Cyrenaica was not initially successful and it was not until the early 1930s that the Kingdom of Italy took full control of the area. 

Several reorganizations of the colonial authority had been made necessary because of armed Arab opposition, mainly in Cyrenaica. Between 1919 (17 May) to 1929 (24 January), the Italian government maintained the two traditional provinces, with separate colonial administrations. A system of controlled local assemblies with limited local authority was set up, but was revoked on 9 March 1927. In 1929, Tripoli and Cyrenaica were united as one colonial province. From 1931 to 1932, Italian forces under General Badoglio waged a punitive pacification campaign. Badoglio's successor in the field, General Rodolfo Graziani, accepted the commission from Mussolini on the condition that he was allowed to crush Libyan resistance unencumbered by the restraints of either Italian or international law. Mussolini reportedly agreed immediately and Graziani intensified the oppression. 

Some Libyans continued to defend themselves, with the strongest voices of dissent coming from the Cyrenaica. Beginning in the first days of Italian colonization, Omar Mukhtar, a Senussi sheikh, organized and, for nearly twenty years, led Libyan resistance efforts. His example continued to inspire resistance even after his capture and execution on 16 September 1931. His face is currently printed on the Libyan ten dinar note in memory and recognition of his patriotism. 

By 1934, Libyan indigenous resistance was effectively crushed. The new Italian governor Italo Balbo created the political entity called Italian Libya in the summer of that year. The classical name "Libya" was revived as the official name of the unified colony. Then in 1937 the colony was split administratively into four provinces: Tripoli, Misrata, Benghazi, and Derna. The Fezzan area was called Territorio Sahara Libico and administered militarily."

Unification with Cyrenaica

Italian Tripolitania and Italian Cyrenaica were formed in 1911, during the conquest of Ottoman Tripolitania in the Italo-Turkish War. In 1934, Italian Tripolitania became part of Italian Libya.

In December 1934, certain rights were guaranteed to autochthonous Libyans (later called by Benito Mussolini "Moslem Italians") including individual freedom, inviolability of home and property, the right to join the military or civil administrations, and the right to freely pursue a career or employment.

In 1937, northern Tripolitania was split into Tripoli Province and Misrata Province. In 1939 Tripolitania was included in the 4th Shore of the Kingdom of Italy.

In early 1943 the region was invaded and occupied by the Allies; this was the end of the Italian colonial presence.

Italy tried unsuccessfully to maintain the colony of Tripolitania after World War II, but in February 1947 relinquished all Italian colonies in a Peace Treaty.

Colonial administration

Provinces
The Province of Tripoli (the most important in all Italian Libya) was subdivided into:
Tripoli
Zawiya
Sugh el Giumaa
Nalut
Gharyan

Demography

A large number of Italian colonists moved to Tripolitania in the late 1930s. These settlers went primarily to the area of Sahel al-Jefara, in Tripolitania, and to the capital Tripoli. In 1939 there were in all Tripolitania nearly 60,000 Italians, most living in Tripoli (whose population was nearly 45% Italian). As a consequence, huge economic improvements arose in all coastal Tripolitania. For example, Italians created the Tripoli Grand Prix, an internationally renowned automobile race. Certain rights were guaranteed to autochthonous Libyans (later called by Benito Mussolini "Moslem Italians") including individual freedom, inviolability of home and property, the right to join the military or civil administrations, and the right to freely pursue a career or employment.

Infrastructure

In Italian Tripolitania, the Italians made significant improvements to the physical infrastructure: The most important were the coastal road between Tripoli and Benghazi and the railways Tripoli-Zuara, Tripoli-Garian and Tripoli-Tagiura. Other important infrastructure improvements were the enlargement of the port of Tripoli and the creation of the Tripoli airport.

A group of villages for Italians and Libyans was created on coastal Tripolitania during the 1930s.

Archaeology and tourism

Classical archaeology was used by the Italian authorities as a propaganda tool to justify their presence in the region. Before 1911, no archeological research was done in Tripolitania and Cyrenaica. By the late 1920s the Italian government had started funding excavations in the main Roman cities of Leptis Magna and Sabratha (Cyrenaica was left for later excavations because of the ongoing colonial war against Muslim rebels in that province). A result of the fascist takeover was that all foreign archaeological expeditions were forced out of Libya, and all archeological work was consolidated under a centralised Italian excavation policy, which exclusively benefitted Italian museums and journals.

After Cyrenaica's full pacification, the Italian archaeological efforts in the 1930s were more focused on the former Greek colony of Cyrenaica than in Tripolitania, which was a Punic colony during the Greek period. The rejection of Phoenician research was partly because of anti-Semitic reasons (the Phoenicians were a Semitic people, distantly related to the Arabs and Jews). Of special interest were the Roman colonies of Leptis Magna and Sabratha, and the preparation of these sites for archaeological tourism.

Tourism was further promoted by the creation of the Tripoli Grand Prix, a racing car event of international importance.

Main military and political developments
1911: Beginning of the Italo-Turkish War. Italian conquest of Tripoli, and Al Khums.
1912:  ends the Italo-Turkish war. Tripolitania and Cyrenaica were ceded to Italy.
1914: Italian advance to Ghat (August) makes Tripolitania (including Fezzan) initially under Italian suzerainty, but because of the recapture of Sabha (November) by Libyan resistance men, the advance turns into retreat.
1915: Italian reverses at the battles of Wadi Marsit, and Al Gardabiya, forced them to withdraw and eventually to retire to Tripoli, Zuwara, and Al Khums.  
1922:Italian forces occupy Misrata, launching the reconquest of Tripolitania.
1924: With the conquest of Sirt, most of Tripolitania (except the Sirt desert) is in Italian hands.
Winter 1927-8: Launching the "29th Parallel line operations", as a result of coordination between the governments of Tripolitania and Cyrenaica, led to the conquest of gulf of Sidra, and linking the two colonies.
1929: Pietro Badoglio becomes a unique governor of Tripolitania and Cyrenaica.
1929-1930: Conquest of Fezzan.
1934:  Tripolitania is incorporated into the Colony of Libya.
1939: Tripolitania is made part of the 4th Shore of the Kingdom of Italy.

Notes

References

Bibliography

 Chapin Metz, Helen, ed. Libya: A Country Study. Washington: GPO for the Library of Congress, 1987.
 Del Boca, Angelo. Gli italiani in Libia. Vol. 1: Tripoli bel suol d'Amore. Milano, Mondadori, 1997.
 Sarti, Durand. The Ax within: Italian Fascism in Action. Modern Viewpoints. New York, 1974.

See also
List of colonial governors of Italian Tripolitania
Postage stamps and postal history of Tripolitania
Banknotes of the Military Authority in Tripolitania
Libyan resistance movement
Territorio Sahara Libico
Italian Libya Railways
4th Shore

History of Tripolitania
Tripolitania
Cyrenaica
Tripolitania
States and territories established in 1911
States and territories disestablished in 1934
Former countries in Africa
Italy–Libya relations
1911 establishments in Africa
1934 disestablishments in Africa
1911 establishments in the Italian Empire
1934 disestablishments in the Italian Empire
Former countries of the interwar period